Martín Molini (born 20 May 1995) is an Argentine retired footballer who played as a forward.

External links
 BDFA profile
 Ceroacero profile
 Soccerway profile
 Worldfootball profile

1995 births
Living people
Argentine footballers
Argentine expatriate footballers
C.D. Huachipato footballers
Chilean Primera División players
Expatriate footballers in Chile
Association football forwards
People from Neuquén